Stylidium scariosum  is a small plant species in the family Ericaceae. It is endemic to  Western Australia.

The species was described in 1839 by Augustin Pyramus de Candolle.

It is found in the IBRA regions of Jarrah Forest, the  Swan Coastal Plain and the Geraldton Sandplains.

References

scariosum
Ericales of Australia
Eudicots of Western Australia
Taxa named by Augustin Pyramus de Candolle
Plants described in 1839